Murex troscheli, also known as Troschel's murex, is a species of large predatory sea snail, a marine gastropod mollusk in the family Muricidae, the rock snails or murex snails.

References

Murex
Gastropods described in 1868